Lewak is a surname. Notable people with the surname include:

Doree Lewak, American writer and humorist
Jarosław Lewak (born 1973), Polish judoka

See also
Lewan

Polish-language surnames